Shingbe is a town in Trashigang District in eastern Bhutan.

References

External links
Satellite map at Maplandia.com
 Map of Bhutan

Populated places in Bhutan